John Joseph DiStaso (February 18, 1954 – April 21, 2022) was an American political journalist from New Hampshire.

Early life 
DiStaso was born and raised in Paterson, New Jersey. He received a bachelor's degree in English literature from Villanova University in 1975 and a master's degree in communications from William Paterson University in 1979.

Career
DiStaso began his career with the New Hampshire Union Leader as a correspondent before becoming a staff reporter in the early 1980s. Beginning in 1982, DiStaso wrote the newspaper's political column, "The Granite Status." He was particularly well known for his work during the New Hampshire presidential primaries, interviewing and candidates participating in the contest as well as moderating debates, and is also credited with the earliest use of the phrase "Republican in Name Only" in 1992. DiStaso was accused of Republican bias in a Columbia Journalism Review article for an interview he conducted with George W. Bush presidential adviser Karl Rove.

Personal life and death
DiStaso was a resident of New Boston, New Hampshire. In 1979, he married Diane Randazza, and they had two children. DiStaso died from pancreatic cancer in Manchester, New Hampshire on April 21, 2022, aged 68.

References

External links

Interview with John DiStaso, The Washington Post blog, January 9, 2006.
Transcript of the January 22, 2004 Democratic candidates debate.

1954 births
2022 deaths
20th-century American journalists
21st-century American journalists
American columnists
American newspaper reporters and correspondents
American political journalists
Deaths from cancer in New Hampshire
Deaths from pancreatic cancer
Journalists from New Hampshire
Journalists from New Jersey
People from New Boston, New Hampshire
Writers from Paterson, New Jersey
Villanova University alumni
William Paterson University alumni